Group D of the 2019 FIFA Women's World Cup took place from 9 to 19 June 2019. The group consisted of Argentina, England, Japan and Scotland. The top two teams, England and Japan, advanced to the round of 16.

Teams

Notes

Standings

In the round of 16:
 The winners of Group D, England, advanced to play the third-placed team of Group E, Cameroon.
 The runners-up of Group D, Japan, advanced to play the winners of Group E, the Netherlands.

Matches
All times listed are local, CEST (UTC+2).

England vs Scotland

Argentina vs Japan

Japan vs Scotland

England vs Argentina

Japan vs England

Scotland vs Argentina

Discipline
Fair play points would have been used as tiebreakers in the group if the overall and head-to-head records of teams were tied, or if teams had the same record in the ranking of third-placed teams. These were calculated based on yellow and red cards received in all group matches as follows:
first yellow card: minus 1 point;
indirect red card (second yellow card): minus 3 points;
direct red card: minus 4 points;
yellow card and direct red card: minus 5 points;

Only one of the above deductions were applied to a player in a single match.

References

External links
 
 2019 FIFA Women's World Cup Group D, FIFA.com

2019 FIFA Women's World Cup
England at the 2019 FIFA Women's World Cup
Scotland at the 2019 FIFA Women's World Cup
Argentina at the 2019 FIFA Women's World Cup
Japan at the 2019 FIFA Women's World Cup